Imuris Municipality is a municipality in Sonora in north-western Mexico.

Area and population
The municipal area is 1,710.3 km2 with a population of 9,988 registered in 2000.  Most of the inhabitants live in the municipal seat, which had a population of 5,767 in 2000.  The municipal population has increased greatly with the installation of maquiladoras and is now estimated to be around 14,000.

Neighboring Municipalities
Neighboring municipalities are  Nogales,  Santa Cruz, Cananea, Arizpe, Cucurpe, and Magdalena de Kino.

Government

Municipal presidents

References

Municipalities of Sonora